Augusta Hornblower (born June 6, 1948) is an American Republican politician from Groton, Massachusetts. She represented the First Middlesex district in the Massachusetts House of Representatives from 1984 to 1994.

See also
 1985-1986 Massachusetts legislature
 1987-1988 Massachusetts legislature
 1989-1990 Massachusetts legislature
 1991-1992 Massachusetts legislature
 1993-1994 Massachusetts legislature

References

1948 births
Living people
Members of the Massachusetts House of Representatives
Women state legislators in Massachusetts
20th-century American women politicians
20th-century American politicians
People from Groton, Massachusetts